Zwalm is a municipality located in Flanders, in the Flemish province of East Flanders, in Belgium. In 2021, Zwalm had a total population of 8,244. The total area is 33.82 km2.

Gallery

References

External links

Official website 

 
Municipalities of East Flanders
Populated places in East Flanders